Red Lightning may refer to:

 Red Lightning (band), a Los Angeles rock band
 Red Lightning (video game), a 1989 computer wargame
 Red lightning, another name for a sprite in meteorology
 VF-194 (Red Lightning), a United States Navy aviation unit
 Red Lightning, a novel by author John Varley.